Thomas or Tom Garvey may refer to:

People
Thomas Garvey, see Shakey the robot
Sheriff Tom Garvey, see Jaybird–Woodpecker War
Tom Garvey (lacrosse) in LXM Pro Tour

Fictional characters
Tommy Garvey, character in The Leftovers
Tom Garvey, character in Frontier played by Stuart Randall (actor)
Tom Garvey, character in The River (1984 film) played by Mel Gibson